The PA-7100LC is a microprocessor that implements the PA-RISC 1.1 instruction set architecture (ISA) developed by Hewlett-Packard (HP). It is also known as the PCX-L, and by its code-name, Hummingbird. It was designed as a low-cost microprocessor for low-end systems. The first systems to feature the PA-7100LC were introduced in January 1994. These systems used 60 and 80 MHz parts. A 100 MHz part debuted in June 1994. The PA-7100LC was the first PA-RISC microprocessor to implement the MAX-1 multimedia instructions, an early single instruction, multiple data (SIMD) multimedia instruction set extension that provided instructions for improving the performance of MPEG video decoding.

The PA-7100LC was based on the PA-7100. Major improvements were improved superscalar execution and an extra integer unit. The PA-7100LC also implemented architectural improvements including the MAX-1 multimedia instructions, uncacheable memory pages, and bi-endian support. Superscalar execution was improved by adding the extra integer unit and modifying the control logic so that two integer instructions, two load-store units, or an integer and a load-store can be issued in one cycle in addition to the existing instruction combinations supported by the PA-7100.

A number of modifications were made to circuits derived from the PA-7100LC. Prominently, the floating-point unit multiplier was modified to take up less area by halving the tree of carry-save adders that summed the partial products of the mantissa. This simplification left the latency of single precision multiplies unchanged (two cycles), but increased the latency of double precision multiplies to three cycles. The performance loss was deemed acceptable as the PA-7100LC was designed for mid-range multimedia workstations where single-precision multiplies are more prevalent. Integrated on-die to lower costs is a memory controller that supports up to 2 GB of memory and an I/O controller.

The organization of the caches is different from that of most HP-designed PA-RISC CPUs. The large external instruction and data caches have been replaced by an on-die instruction cache with a 1 KB capacity and a large external 8 KB to 2 MB cache. The external cache is unified, containing both instructions and data.

The PA-7100LC consists of 900,000 transistors and measures 14.2 by 14.2 mm for an area of 201.64 mm2. It was fabricated by HP in their 0.8 μm three-level metal CMOS26B process. The PA-7100LC is packaged in a 432-pin ceramic pin grid array.

PA-7300LC

The PA-7300LC was a further development of the PA-7100LC. It was introduced in mid-1996 as a low-end to mid-range microprocessor complementing the high-end PA-8000 in HP's workstations and servers. The PA-7300LC integrates an improved PA-7100LC, 64 KB instruction and data caches, L2 cache controller, memory controller and a GSC bus controller onto a single chip. It was the first PA-RISC microprocessor to include any significant amount of on-chip cache. The L2 unified cache was optional and could be protected by parity. It could be built from register-to-register, flow-through or asynchronous SRAM.

The PA-7300LC contained 9.2 million transistors, of which 1.2 million are used in logic and 8 million are used in the caches; and measured 15.3 by 17.0 mm for an area of 260.1 mm2. It was fabricated by HP in their CMOS14C process, a 0.5 µm, 3.3 V, four-layer-metal CMOS process.

References

 Gwennap, Linley (24 January 1994). "New PA-RISC Processor Decodes MPEG Video". Microprocessor Report. pp. 16–17.
 Gwennap, Linley (13 November 1995). "Integrated PA-7300LC Powers HP Midrange". Microprocessor Report.
 Hollenbeck, D. et al. (1996). "PA7300LC integrates cache for cost/performance". COMPCON '96 Digest of Technical Papers.
 Josephson, D.; Storey, M.; Dixon, D. (1995). "Microprocessor IDDQ testing: a case study". IEEE Design & Test of Computers.
 Josephson, D.D.; Dixon D.J.; Arnold B.J. (1993). "Test features of HP PA7100LC processor". Proceedings of IEEE International Test Conference.
 Kever, W. et al. (1997). "A 200 MHz RISC microprocessor with 128 kB on-chip caches". ISSCC Digest of Technical Papers.
 Knebel, P. et al. (1993). "HP's PA7100LC: a low-cost superscalar PA-RISC processor". COMPCON Spring '93 Digest of Papers.
 Knebel, P. et al. (1995). "The PA 7100LC Microprocessor: A Case Study of IC Design Decisions in a Competitive Environment". hpjournal Apr 1995".
 Lee, R.B. (1995). "Realtime MPEG video via software decomposition on a PA-RISC processor".
 Lee, R.B. (April 1995). "Accelerating multimedia with enhanced microprocessors". IEEE Micro.
 Meneghini, T.; Josephson, D. (1997). "IDDQ testing of a 180 MHz HP PA-RISC microprocessor with redundancy programmed caches". IEEE International Workshop on IDDQ Digest of Technical Papers.
 Undy, S. et al. (April 1994). "A low-cost graphics and multimedia workstation chip set". IEEE Micro.
 PA-7100LC PA-RISC Processor OpenPA.net PA-7300LC PA-RISC Processor OpenPA.net''

External links 
Hummingbird: A Low-Cost Superscaler PA_RISC Processor, lecture by Stephen Undy

HP microprocessors
Superscalar microprocessors